Vaslui County is a county (județ) of Romania, in the historical region Western Moldavia, with the seat at Vaslui.

Demographics 

In 2011, it had a population of 395,499 and the population density was 74/km².

 Romanians - over 98%
 Romas, other ethnicities -  2%

Geography
This county has an area of 5,318 km².

The county lies on a plane, being bounded by the Prut River on the east and crossed in its centre by Bârlad River, a tributary of Siret River.

Neighbours

 Republic of Moldova to the east - Cantemir raion and Cahul raion.
 Neamț County, Bacău County and Vrancea County to the west.
 Iași County to the north.
 Galați County to the south.

People
 Dimitrie Cantemir
 Alexandru Ioan Cuza
 Gheorghe Gheorghiu-Dej
 Alexandra Nechita
 Ana Pauker
 Ștefan Procopiu
 Emil Racoviță
 Constantin Tănase
 Nicolae Tonitza
 Alexandru Vlahuță

Economy
Vaslui County was heavily industrialised during the Communist period and had large industrial complexes that went bankrupt during the 1990s. Today, the county's industry is mainly agricultural one, with other industries concentrated in the main urban areas.

County's main industries:
 mechanical components;
 chemicals;
 food stuffs;
 textiles.

Tourism
The main tourist destinations are the cities of Vaslui, Bârlad, and Huși. The Vaslui County Council, the county councils of the Leova and Hîncești districts in Republic of Moldova, and the European Union (through the Phare program), have set up a program which seeks to promote tourism in these regions. The main tourist attractions of the Vaslui-Hîncești-Leova touristic program are, among others, the medieval and early modern churches and monasteries, the Manuc Bei Hunting Palace and the Manuc - Mirzaian Manor Palace (similar to Manuc's Inn in Bucharest) in Hîncești, as well as the region's natural riches.

Politics 

The Vaslui County Council, renewed at the 2020 local elections, consists of 34 counsellors, with the following party composition:

Administrative divisions

Vaslui County has 3 municipalities, 2 towns and 81 communes

Municipalities
Bârlad
Huși
Vaslui: capital city;

Towns
Murgeni
Negrești

Communes

Albești
Alexandru Vlahuță
Arsura
Băcani
Băcești
Bălteni
Banca
Berezeni
Blăgești
Bogdana
Bogdănești
Bogdănița
Boțești
Bunești-Averești
Ciocani
Codăești
Coroiești
Costești
Cozmești
Crețești
Dănești
Deleni
Delești
Dimitrie Cantemir
Dodești
Dragomirești
Drânceni
Duda-Epureni
Dumești
Epureni
Fălciu
Ferești
Fruntișeni
Găgești
Gârceni
Gherghești
Grivița
Hoceni
Iana
Ibănești
Ivănești
Ivești
Laza
Lipovăț
Lunca Banului
Mălușteni
Miclești
Muntenii de Jos
Muntenii de Sus
Oltenești
Oșești
Pădureni
Perieni
Pochidia
Pogana
Pogonești
Poienești
Puiești
Pungești
Pușcași
Rafaila
Rebricea
Roșiești
Solești
Stănilești
Ștefan cel Mare
Șuletea
Tăcuta
Tanacu
Tătărăni
Todirești
Tutova
Văleni
Vetrișoaia
Viișoara
Vinderei
Voinești
Vulturești
Vutcani
Zăpodeni
Zorleni

Historical county

The county was located in the  central-eastern part of Romania, in the center of the historical region of Moldavia. At present, most of its territory is included in the current Vaslui County borders, smaller parts being included in Iași County and Bacău County. It bordered on the north with the Iași County, to the west with Roman County, to the east with Fălciu County and to the south with the Tutova and Bacău Counties.

Administration

The county was originally divided administratively into four districts (plăși):
Plasa Crasna, headquartered at Crasna
Plasa Racova, headquartered at Racova
Plasa Stemnic

Subsequently, the territory of the county was reorganized, being divided into three different districts:
Plasa Movila lui Burcel, headquartered at Codăești
Plasa Peneș Curcanul, headquartered at Pungești
Plasa Ștefan cel Mare, headquartered at Negrești

Population 
According to the 1930 census data, the county population was 139,503 inhabitants, 93.4% Romanians, 3.6% Jews, 2.3% Romanies, as well as other minorities. From the religious point of view, the population was 95.7% Eastern Orthodox, 3.6% Jewish, 0.2% Roman Catholic, as well as other minorities.

Urban population 
In 1930, the county's urban population was 15,310 inhabitants, comprising 72.5% Romanians, 21.4% Jews, 3.0% Romanies, as well as other minorities. From the religious point of view, the urban population was composed of 76.4% Eastern Orthodox, 21.4% Jewish, 1.1% Roman Catholic, as well as other minorities.

References

External links
 Vaslui-Turism.ro - Official tourism website from the Vaslui County Council

 
Counties of Romania
1938 disestablishments in Romania
1940 establishments in Romania
1950 disestablishments in Romania
1968 establishments in Romania
States and territories disestablished in 1938
States and territories established in 1940
States and territories disestablished in 1950
States and territories established in 1968